Sergey Viktorovich Lavrov (born 21 March 1950) is a Russian diplomat and politician who has served as the Foreign Minister of Russia since 2004.

Lavrov served as the Permanent Representative of Russia to the United Nations from 1994 to 2004.

Early life and education
Lavrov was born on 21 March 1950 in Moscow, to an Armenian father from Tbilisi, Georgian SSR, and a Russian mother from Noginsk, Russian SFSR. His father's surname was originally Kalantaryan. His mother worked in the Soviet Ministry for Foreign Trade. Lavrov graduated from high school with a silver medal. Since his favorite class was physics, he planned to enter either the National Research Nuclear University or the Moscow Institute of Physics and Technology, but he entered the Moscow State Institute of International Relations (MGIMO) and graduated in 1972.

During his education at the MGIMO, Lavrov studied international relations. Soon he learned Sinhalese, then the only official language of Sri Lanka, as well as Dhivehi, the official language of the Maldives. He also learned English and French. After he was admitted to the university, Lavrov, along with other students, was sent for a month to a student construction brigade building the Ostankino Tower.

During his summer vacations, Lavrov also worked in his university's student construction brigades in Khakassia, Tuva and the Russian Far East. Each semester, Lavrov with his fellow students conducted drama performances, which were later presented on the main stage of the university. During the third year of his studies, Lavrov was married.

Career

Soviet diplomat in Sri Lanka (1972–1976) 
Lavrov graduated in 1972. According to the rules of that time, a graduate of the Moscow State Institute of International Relations had to work for the Foreign Ministry for a certain amount of time. Lavrov was employed in the Soviet embassy in Sri Lanka as an advisor, as he was already a specialist on the country. At the time, the Soviet Union and Sri Lanka had close market and economic cooperation and the Soviet Union launched the production of natural rubber in the country.

The Soviet embassy in Sri Lanka also maintained relations with the Maldives. The embassy in Sri Lanka employed only 24 diplomats. Lavrov was given the task of continuously analysing the situation in the country, but he also worked as a translator, personal secretary and assistant to Rafiq Nishonov, who would later become the 12th First Secretary of the Communist Party of Uzbek SSR. In addition, he gained the diplomatic rank of an attaché.

USSR Section for International Economic Relations and the UN 
In 1976, Lavrov returned to Moscow. He worked as a third and second secretary in the Section for International Economic Relations of the USSR. There, he was involved in analytics and his office also worked with various international organizations, including the United Nations.

In 1981, he was sent as a senior adviser to the Soviet mission to the United Nations in New York City.

In 1988, Lavrov returned to Moscow and was named Deputy Chief of the Section for International Economic Relations of the USSR. Between 1990 and 1992 he worked as Director of the International Organization of the Soviet Foreign Ministry.

Soviet-to-CIS transition (1990–1994)
In October 1990, Andrey Kozyrev, who was in charge of monitoring international organizations at the time, was named Foreign Minister of the Russian SFSR. In that year, the powers of the Soviet Foreign Ministry and the Foreign Ministry of the Russian Soviet Federative Socialist Republic were distributed. Until then the Russian SFSR had only a ceremonial role. In October 1991, the foreign ministers of all Soviet republics, except Georgia and the Baltic states, held a meeting where they dealt with the Union of Foreign Ministries.

In November 1990, the State Council decided to change its name from the Union of Foreign Ministries to the Foreign Ministry of the Soviet Union. In April 1991, he was named deputy foreign minister.

In December 1991 the Foreign Ministry of Soviet Russia became the Foreign Ministry of the Russian Federation.

In 1992, Lavrov was named director of the Department for International Organizations and Global Issues in the Foreign Ministry of the Russian Federation.

Lavrov was asked to oversee the activities of the Human Rights and International Cultural Cooperation and the two departments – for the CIS countries, international organizations and international economic cooperation.

Lavrov was promoted to the diplomatic rank of the Ambassador Extraordinary and Plenipotentiary — the highest diplomatic rank in the Russian Federation — by the Decree of the President of Russia of 5 June 1992 No. 568.

Russian Permanent Representative to the UN (1994–2004)
Lavrov worked for the Ministry of Foreign Affairs until 1994 when he returned to work in the United Nations, this time as the Permanent Representative of Russia. While in the latter position, he was the President of the United Nations Security Council in December 1995, June 1997, July 1998, October 1999, December 2000, April 2002, and June 2003.

Foreign minister of Russia (2004–present)
 

On 9 March 2004, President Vladimir Putin appointed Lavrov to the post of minister of foreign affairs. He succeeded Igor Ivanov in the post.

Lavrov held on to his position through Vladimir Putin's Second Cabinet while Dmitri Medvedev occupied the presidency from 2008 to 2012.

On 21 May 2012, Lavrov was reappointed foreign minister to the cabinet led by prime minister Dimitri Medvedev.

Lavrov is regarded as continuing in the style of his predecessor: a brilliant diplomat but a civil servant rather than a politician. A Russian foreign policy expert at London's Chatham House has described him as "a tough, reliable, extremely sophisticated negotiator" but adds that "he's not part of Putin's inner sanctum" and that the toughening of Russian foreign policy has got very little to do with him.

US politicians have been much more critical in their appraisal of Lavrov, seeing him as emblematic of President Putin's resurgent violent foreign policies. Then US Secretary of State Hillary Clinton found that Lavrov treated her poorly during negotiations, like a "jerk."

On 15 January 2020, he resigned as part of the cabinet, after President Vladimir Putin delivered the Presidential Address to the Federal Assembly, in which he proposed several amendments to the constitution. On 21 January 2020, he maintained his position in Mikhail Mishustin's Cabinet.

Civil war in Syria
In 2012, in the early stages of the Syrian Civil War, a Russian delegation travelled to Syria to affirm Russia's backing of the Syrian government of the President Bashar al-Assad. Lavrov and Mikhail Fradkov, who were part of the delegation, were given a favorable welcome by thousands of pro-Assad supporters. The supporters waved Russian flags in thanks to Russia's veto of a UN resolution calling for tough sanctions on the Syrian government.

In September 2013, then Secretary of State John Kerry and Lavrov reached a breakthrough agreement that would destroy almost all chemical weapons stored in Assad's Syria. The deal was reached after three challenging rounds of talks in Geneva, Switzerland. Soon after, Syria fully accepted this plan, and by June 2014 all chemical weapons submitted by the Syrian government were safely incinerated in the Eastern Mediterranean. The director general of the Organisation for the Prohibition of Chemical Weapons at the United Nations declared that this treaty was a major benchmark.

In October 2019, Lavrov condemned Donald Trump's decision to send American troops to guard Syria's oil fields and possibly exploit them, saying that any "exploitation of natural resources of a sovereign state without its consent is illegal".

Russian-Ukrainian conflict 2014

After the March 2014 Crimean status referendum, Lavrov proposed that Ukraine should be independent of any bloc, that the Russian language be recognised officially, and that the constitution be organised along federal lines. In an interview with the Russia-24 TV channel, Lavrov said that the zero-sum "either-or" bloc-politics of Ukraine were first suggested in 2004 by Karel De Gucht, then Foreign Minister of Belgium.

When G8 leaders voted to officially suspend Russia's membership on 24 March, Lavrov stated that the G8 was an informal organization and membership was optional for Russia.

In a 30 March interview, he spoke of the 21 February agreement which was signed by Viktor Yanukovich, Vitaly Klitchko, Arseniy Yatsenyuk, and Oleg Tyagnibok as well as the Foreign Ministers of Poland, France and Germany to promote peaceful changes in Ukrainian power. Lavrov stressed federalism as a solution to the constitutional impasse in Ukraine, and deplored the de-officialisation of the Russian language. He noticed the work of the secretariat of the Council of Europe at the Venice Commission to prevent a legitimation of the Crimean referendum, and to expel Russia. Lavrov was "taken aback" when US President Barack Obama called Russia a "regional power". He deplored the misuse of the Schengen Agreement to force Crimeans to visit Kyiv in order to gain a Schengen visa, and noticed that the E.U. proposes a visa-free regime for Ukrainian citizens. Lavrov stated that the Revolution of Dignity in Kyiv and the results of the Crimean referendum should both be accepted equally by the West. He reiterated the three-part Russian proposal for the progress of Ukraine:
 Constitutional federalism
 Recognition of linguistic minorities
 That Ukraine be a non-aligned state

The Kyiv government on 30 March denounced Lavrov's proposals as amounting to "the complete capitulation of Ukraine, its dismemberment, and the destruction of Ukrainian statehood.

While Lavrov acknowledged that Russia is in contact with the Ukrainian separatist rebels he denied US and EU allegations that Moscow sponsored the rebellion and accused the United States of aggravating the conflict. "Our American colleagues still prefer to push the Ukrainian leadership toward a confrontational path." He added that chances for settling the Ukrainian crisis would have been higher if it only depended on Russia and Europe. Lavrov said the separatists want to "defend their culture, their traditions, celebrate their holidays rather than anniversaries of Roman Shukhevych and Stepan Bandera."

In June 2016, Lavrov stated that Russia will never attack any NATO country, saying: "I am convinced that all serious and honest politicians know perfectly well than Russia will never attack a member state of NATO. We have no such plans." He also said: "In our security doctrine it is clearly stated that one of the main threats to our safety is the further expansion of NATO to the east."

2017 North Korea crisis 
Lavrov likened the war of words between US President Donald Trump and North Korean leader Kim Jong-un to a kindergarten fight between two children, saying "Together with China we'll continue to strive for a reasonable approach and not an emotional one like when children in a kindergarten start fighting and no-one can stop them."

Lavrov also said that the United States would not carry out a strike on North Korea because "they know for sure – rather than suspect – that it has atomic bombs." He said the US invaded Iraq "solely because they had 100 percent information that there were no weapons of mass destruction left there."

US sanctions 
Lavrov criticized US sanctions against countries like Iran, Turkey and Russia. In August 2018, Lavrov said, "unilateral enforcement measures are illegitimate in international affairs" [...]. "One way to counter these illegitimate barriers and restrictions is we can use national currencies on our bilateral trade". "I strongly believe that abuse of the role the U.S. dollar plays as an international currency will eventually result in its role being undermined".

Businesses involved in Nord Stream 2 natural gas pipeline from Russia to Germany have been sanctioned by the United States with the passing of the National Defense Authorization Act for Fiscal Year 2020 on 20 December 2019. Lavrov said that US Congress "is literally overwhelmed with the desire to do everything to destroy" the Russia–United States relations.

Ukraine's education law 
Lavrov condemned Ukraine's 2017 education law, which makes Ukrainian the only language of education in state schools. According to Lavrov, the "reaction of Brussels to the Ukrainian Law on Education is utterly vague although it crudely violates Kyiv's commitments on linguistic and educational rights." Russia's Foreign Ministry stated that the law is designed to "forcefully establish a mono-ethnic language regime in a multinational state."

Non-citizens in Latvia and Estonia 
As early as 2011 Lavrov criticized the status of "non-citizens" in Latvia and Estonia, calling the problem of Russian speaking stateless persons "shameful for the EU."

NATO's Defender-Europe 2021 
In 2021, Lavrov was critical of a massive NATO-led military exercise called Defender-Europe 21, one of the largest NATO-led military exercises in Europe in decades, which began in March 2021. It included "nearly simultaneous operations across more than 30 training areas" in Estonia, Bulgaria, Romania and other countries. He said that Russia's response was inevitable.

2022 Russian invasion of Ukraine

In January 2022, the United States accused Russia of sending saboteurs into Ukraine to stage "a false-flag operation" that would create a pretext for Russia to invade Ukraine. Lavrov dismissed the US claim as "total disinformation." On 4 February 2022, Lavrov dismissed as "nonsense" and "craziness" allegations by the United States that Russia was preparing a fake video of the Ukrainian forces attacking the separatist-held Donbas as a pretext for starting a war in Ukraine. On 10 February 2022, Lavrov met with British Foreign Secretary Liz Truss. In the context of tensions between Russia and the West over a build up of Russian troops near the Russia–Ukraine border talks between the two foreign ministers were described as "difficult". Lavrov denied that Russia has any plans to invade Ukraine. He described Western "demands to remove Russian troops from Russian territory" as "regrettable."

On 25 February 2022, the day after Russia began a full-scale invasion of Ukraine, Lavrov claimed that Putin ordered the invasion to "free Ukrainians from oppression". The same day, the US, UK, EU and Canada announced sanctions against Lavrov as well as Putin. The US added Lavrov to the Specially Designated Nationals and Blocked Persons List. On 26 February, Australia announced similar sanctions on Lavrov. On 1 March most diplomats at the United Nations Human Rights Council (UNHRC) in Geneva staged a walkout in protest at the Russian invasion of Ukraine as Lavrov began to speak to the assembly via video from Moscow. Lavrov criticized the West on some policies relating to Ukraine, denouncing his prevention on flying to Geneva due to the ban on Russian aircraft on EU airspace as "Trying to avoid a candid face-to-face dialogue or direct contacts designed to help identify political solutions to pressing international issues." He was also quoted "The West clearly has lost self-control in venting anger against Russia and has destroyed its own rules and institutions." Lavrov, who read from a prepared text, repeated Putin's 23 February goal statement: "The goal of our actions is to save people by fulfilling our allied obligations, as well as to demilitarize and denazify Ukraine so that such things never happen again."

On 2 March 2022, Lavrov explained in an interview with Al Jazeera, Moscow, how the invasion of Ukraine came about in the context of an international crisis that already existed well before 2014. According to him, Russia had to annex the Crimea in 2014 due to the unacceptable risk that NATO naval bases would replace the Russian military port there. He primarily contests the legitimacy of the putsch against Viktor Yanukovych, who according to the Russian leadership already initiated "peace" in Ukraine, with respect to all Russian speaking minorities. He accuses the West of not supporting the special status of those minorities, before Yanukovych was deposed by the Orange Revolution in 2004–2005. He continued that Zelenskyy did not improve the situation any further, and that Putin had to order the invasion of Ukraine, because the US did not comply or even address the security concerns of Russia's western flank. Lavrov claimed the US exerted similar pressures on Iraq in 2003, which the US invaded later for no reason other than "a vial of unidentified chemicals". At the same time, Lavrov tries to portray the current Ukrainian government as "nationalistic" and "right wing" because it does not incorporate historical and linguistic ties to Russia into national policies, and only excels to separate itself from a shared history and culture.

On 28 March 2022, he praised the relations between Russia and China as the best in history. On 1 April 2022, he met with Indian Prime Minister Narendra Modi and said that Russia “appreciates” India's neutral position on the war in Ukraine.

On 7 April 2022, the United Nations General Assembly in New York voted to suspend Russia from the UNHRC over its behaviour in Ukraine: "93 members voted in favour of the diplomatic rebuke while 24 were against and 58 abstained. This met the required threshold of a two-thirds majority of the assembly members that vote yes or no, with abstentions not counting in the calculation." Linda Thomas-Greenfield had spearheaded the effort and Dmytro Kuleba thought it appropriate and published his thanks while UK Ambassador James Roscoe observed of the Putin administration who tried to quit the body after the fact that it sounded "like someone that’s just been fired tendering their resignation." On 25 April, Lavrov accused NATO of fighting a proxy war with Russia that could escalate into a global conflict with nuclear weapons. U.S. Defense Secretary Lloyd Austin said that "it's unhelpful and dangerous to rattle sabers and speculate about the use of nuclear weapons."

On 1 May 2022, in an interview with the Italian television broadcaster Rete 4, Lavrov was asked why Russia claimed it needed to "denazify" Ukraine, considering the Ukrainian president himself was Jewish. Lavrov responded by suggesting that Adolf Hitler, like Volodymyr Zelenskyy, had Jewish heritage, saying "as to [Zelenskyy's] argument of what kind of nazification can we have if I'm Jewish, if I remember correctly, and I may be wrong, Hitler also had Jewish blood." Lavrov elaborated "for some time we have heard from the Jewish people that the biggest antisemites were Jewish." Israeli prime minister Naftali Bennett condemned Lavrov's comments and said that "using the Holocaust of the Jewish people as a political tool must cease immediately". On 5 May, Bennett's office issued a statement saying: "The Prime Minister accepted President Putin's apology for Lavrov's remarks and thanked him for clarifying his attitude towards the Jewish people and the memory of the Holocaust". Lavrov was criticized by Deborah Lipstadt for the remarks.

On 14 May 2022, Lavrov used the phrase "total hybrid war" in the course of describing the West's efforts to help Ukraine combat the 2022 Russian invasion.

On 6 June 2022, according to Večernje novosti, Sergey Lavrov was due to visit the Serbian capital, Belgrade. However the countries of Bulgaria, North Macedonia, and Montenegro, which surround Serbia, refused Lavrov permission to use their airspace, which led to the cancellation of the visit.

On 16 June 2022, in an interview with the BBC's Steve Rosenberg, Lavrov stated that Russia did not invade Ukraine, but instead "declared a special military operation because we had absolutely no other way of explaining to the West that dragging Ukraine into Nato was a criminal act." He again repeated the Kremlin's claim that there were Nazis in Ukraine. Lavrov was also asked about a report by the United Nations on an incident involving the Russian military in Yahidne, Ukraine. Lavrov replied: "It's a great pity but international diplomats, including the UN High Commissioner for Human Rights, the UN Secretary-General and other UN representatives, are being put under pressure by the West. And very often they're being used to amplify fake news spread by the West. Russia is not squeaky clean. Russia is what it is. And we are not ashamed of showing who we are."

On 8 July 2022, Lavrov left the G20 summit of foreign ministers in Bali, Indonesia because he disliked the questions about Putin's invasion of Ukraine. He left when German foreign minister Annalena Baerbock began her formal address. Ukraine sympathizers refused to join a group photo with Lavrov, who seemed perplexed at the criticism.

On 20 July 2022, Lavrov publicly confirmed that Russia had as a goal not only to "liberate" the Donbas region, but also to occupy the Kherson region, the Zaporizhzhia region and several other territories, supposedly as a response to Ukraine receiving weapons support from abroad. On 26 July 2022, he said: ”We are determined to help the people of eastern Ukraine to liberate themselves from the burden of this absolutely unacceptable regime,”

In July 2022, he visited Egypt, Congo, Uganda and Ethiopia and praised the neutral position taken by African countries towards the war in Ukraine. On 6 July 2022, he met with Vietnamese Foreign Minister Bùi Thanh Sơn in Hanoi and called Vietnam a "key partner" of Russia in ASEAN. On 28 July 2022, Lavrov attended the meeting of foreign ministers of the Shanghai Cooperation Organisation (SCO). He met with Chinese Foreign Minister Wang Yi and praised the "traditional friendship" between Russia and China. He described Myanmar as a "friendly and longstanding partner."

On 2 September 2022, Lavrov was concerned over the delay in obtaining US visas for himself and his staff for the yearly meeting of world leaders at the UNGA on 19 September. "Not a single member of the 56-member Russian advance team and delegation" had received the visas. The US protested that this was due to the expulsion of staff from its Moscow embassy. Lavrov backed India and Brazil for permanent membership at the UN Security Council.

On 11 September 2022, Lavrov said that he has not given up on the idea of peace talks with Kyiv. According to his views, "the longer this process is delayed, the harder it will be to reach an agreement." Kyiv and Moscow have held intermittent peace talks since late February 2022, sponsored by Russia's foreign ministry.

One week before the 2022 Russian mobilization, Lavrov assured the Russians that there would be no mobilization or martial law.

On 23 September 2022, Lavrov attended the annual U.N. General Assembly meeting in New York City, after he received permission to travel to the United States. The Russian foreign minister regretted that he was not able to attend the full presentation by U.S. Secretary of State Antony Blinken. Lavrov attempted to convince the audience that 'countries supplying weapons to Ukraine and training its soldiers were parties to the conflict'. He said that Russian-occupied territories of Ukraine would be under Russia's "full protection" if they are annexed by Russia. Lavrov again falsely claimed that the elected government in Ukraine was illegitimately installed and filled with neo-Nazis. Ukraine's Foreign Minister Dmytro Kuleba said Lavrov's comments about using nuclear weapons were "irresponsible" and "absolutely unacceptable".

On 14 November, the Associated Press reported, citing Indonesia officials, that Lavrov had been admitted to hospital with a heart condition. An aide subsequently released a video on Telegram showing Lavrov laughing at such reports from his hotel in Bali, claiming Western media was at fault for "some kind of game".

On 28 December, Lavrov stated on national television: "I am convinced that thanks to our perseverance, patience and determination, we will defend the noble goals that are vital for our people and our country". He also stated: "Our absolute priority is four new Russian regions". He also stated that peace talks with Ukraine would only resume if it recognized the annexation of the four regions only partially occupied: "They should become free from the threat of Nazification that they have faced for many years".

On 4 March 2023 the BBC reported that Lavrov was laughed at by a conference audience after a G20 foreign ministers’ meeting in Delhi after saying the Ukraine war was "launched against us". Lavrov claimed Russia was trying to stop the Ukraine war, which began after its own full-scale invasion in February 2022. Video footage of the incident was also published and the laughter could be heard in the audio.

Personal life
Lavrov speaks Russian, English, French, Dhivehi and Sinhala.

Lavrov is a keen sportsman. He likes to watch football games on television and is an ardent fan of the Moscow club Spartak Moscow. He has been married since 1971 to Maria Lavrova and they have one daughter and two grandchildren. Their daughter Ekaterina Sergeyevna Lavrova, who lived in the US and London while her father was working for the United Nations, is a graduate of Columbia University. Having stayed in New York City until 2014, and spent a long time outside Russia, she is not fluent in Russian. She is married to Russian businessman Alexander Vinokurov.

Lavrov has allegedly had a relationship with his mistress, Svetlana Polyakova, since the early 2000s. In 2016, her daughter Polina Kovaleva purchased an apartment in London's elite district of Kensington for £4.4 million in cash when she was 21 years old. She has a master’s degree from Imperial College London. On 25 March 2022, the British government sanctioned her over allegations of "dirty money" as a part of a broader sanctions regime against corrupt Russian interests following the Russian invasion of Ukraine in late February.

Sanctions
Lavrov is under personal sanctions in the European Union, the United Kingdom, the United States, Canada, Japan, and Australia for his role in the 2022 Russian invasion of Ukraine. In March 2022, the UK sanctioned Lavrov's stepdaughter, Polina Kovaleva. In April 2022, Canada imposed sanctions against Lavrov's wife and daughter, Maria Lavrova and Ekaterina Vinokurova. The latter was soon included in Australia's sanction list as well.

Honors

Russian Honors
 He is an honorary member of the Imperial Orthodox Palestine Society.
 Order of Sergius of Radonezh 1st Class (Russia, 2015) – For his political efforts that have benefited the Russian Orthodox Church
 Order of Merit for the Fatherland, 1st class (2015), 2nd class (2010), 3rd class (2005) and 4th class (1998)
 Order of Honour (1996)
 Honoured Worker of the Diplomatic Service of the Russian Federation (2004)
 Order of the Holy Prince Daniel of Moscow, 1st class (Russian Orthodox Church, 2010) and 2nd class
 Honorary medal "For participation in the programs of the United Nations" (UN Association of Russia, 2005)
 Hero of Labour of the Russian Federation (2020)

International honors

 Order of Friendship (Kazakhstan, 2005)
 Grand Cross of the Order of the Sun (Peru, 2007)
 Order of Friendship of Peoples (Belarus, 2006)
 Order of Friendship (Vietnam, 2009)
 Order of Friendship (Laos)
 Medal of Honour (South Ossetia, 19 March 2010) – for his great personal contribution to strengthening international security, peace and stability in the Caucasus, the development of friendly relations between the Republic of South Ossetia and the Russian Federation
 Order of St. Mashtots (Armenia, 19 August 2010) – for outstanding contribution to the consolidation and development of age-old Armenian-Russian friendly relations
 Gold Medal of the Yerevan State University (Armenia, 2007)
 Honorary Doctorate in Diplomacy from University of Piraeus. (Greece 2016)
 Order of the Serbian Flag, 1st class (Serbia, 2016)
 Order of the Republika Srpska, (Republic of Srpska, 2018)
 Order of Saint Agatha Knight Grand Cross San Marino 2019
 Order of Friendship, Uzbekistan 2020
 Order of the Leopard 1st Class, Kazakhstan 2020
 Order of Makarios III Grand Cross (Cyprus 2020)
 Order of the Union (UAE 2021)

Criticism

A Politico profile from 2017 featured assessments from a senior Bush official of Lavrov as "a complete asshole". John Negroponte said of Lavrov that "His two objectives were always the same: Veto things for the greater glory of Russia and to take the Americans down wherever possible... If he has a moral compass, my Geiger counter hasn’t clicked into it." An official in the Obama administration said "He’s a nasty SOB. He would be relentlessly berating and browbeating and sarcastic and nasty." Another said he was "acerbic and nasty".

According to Western diplomats, Lavrov has no real influence on Russia's foreign policy and has become a mere propagandist and mouthpiece for Putin. Regarding Russia's invasion of Ukraine, foreign policy expert Angela Stent said: "As far as we know, Lavrov himself only knew [the invasion] was happening as it was taking place."

Rescinded honorary doctorate 
 Lavrov was given an honorary doctorate by the University of Tromsø in Norway in 2011 for his role in peacefully negotiating a maritime delimitation line between Norwegian and Russian sector of the Barents sea. In 2022 due to his involvement in the invasion of Ukraine and related violations of international law the degree was revoked. Lavrov is the only person to have had an honorary doctoral degree rescinded in Norway.

See also

 List of current foreign ministers
 Foreign relations of Russia
 SDN List

References

Further reading
 
 Kaukas, Erikas. "Analysis of Securitization of the Baltic States in the Rhetoric of Russian Foreign Minister Sergey Lavrov." Lithuanian Annual Strategic Review 17.1 (2019): 211–229.
 Miskimmon, Alister, and Ben O'Loughlin. "Russia's Narratives of Global Order: Great Power Legacies in a Polycentric World." Politics and governance 5.3 (2017): 111–120. online
 Rosefielde, Steven. Putin's Russia: Economy, Defence and Foreign Policy (2020) excerpt
 Rotaru, Vasile. "'Mimicking' the West? Russia's legitimization discourse from Georgia war to the annexation of Crimea." Communist and Post-Communist Studies 52.4 (2019): 311–321. online
 
 
 Ziegler, Charles E. "Russian Diplomacy: Challenging the West." Whitehead Journal of Diplomacy and International Relations 19 (2018): 74+ online.

External links

Biographical information on Lavrov on the Department of Foreign Affairs site
 Ministry of Foreign Affairs of Russia
 Moscow State Institute of International Relations

 Sergeï Lavrov interview (2008) | Piotr Fedorov of euronews
Russia's Foreign Minister Sergey Lavrov (22 July 2017) | Keir Simmons of NBC News
Sergey Lavrov, Russia's Foreign Minister, on Skripals, Trump 'kompromat' claims and OPCW (29 June 2018) | Cathy Newman of Channel 4 News

|-

1950 births
Living people
Politicians from Moscow
Foreign ministers of Russia
Permanent Representatives of Russia to the United Nations
Russian people of Armenian descent
Soviet diplomats
Ambassador Extraordinary and Plenipotentiary (Russian Federation)
United Russia politicians
Russian conspiracy theorists
People stripped of honorary degrees
Russian individuals subject to the U.S. Department of the Treasury sanctions
Specially Designated Nationals and Blocked Persons List
Russian individuals subject to European Union sanctions
Moscow State Institute of International Relations alumni
Grand Crosses of the Order of the Sun of Peru
Recipients of the Order of Holy Prince Daniel of Moscow
Recipients of the Order of Honour (Russia)
Full Cavaliers of the Order "For Merit to the Fatherland"
Recipients of the Friendship Order
21st-century Russian politicians
Russian individuals subject to United Kingdom sanctions
Anti-Ukrainian sentiment in Russia
21st-century Russian diplomats